Allen Michels (born c. 1941) is a business executive and founder of Convergent Technologies and The Dana Group.

Career
Prior to him co-founding Convergent, Michels held management positions for Digital Equipment Corporation and Intel. Michels co-founded Convergent Technologies in 1979. The company made computer hardware and was purchased by Unisys in 1988. He served as the CEO of the company until 1985 when he and other executives left to form The Dana Group (Dana Computer). The Dana Group would be renamed Ardent Computer in 1987 due to another company already having the name Dana Computer. Ardent built Titan graphics workstations.

Michels came out of retirement in 1993 to join Dean Snow as a founder of Macinstitute.

References 

American chief executives
Living people
Year of birth missing (living people)
Place of birth missing (living people)
Intel people